Hans Krafft the Elder (1481–c.1542) was a German medalist, and master of the Nuremberg mint. Krafft worked from designs by Albrecht Dürer and Lucas Cranach, among other artists.

A silver medal struck by Krafft of Charles V, Holy Roman Emperor sold for £258,750 in December 2009.

References

External links
 Krafft at the National Gallery of Scotland

1481 births
1542 deaths
German goldsmiths
German medallists
German sculptors
German male sculptors